Hemithecium is a genus of lichenized fungi in the family Graphidaceae. The genus was circumscribed by Vittore Benedetto Antonio Trevisan de Saint-Léon in 1853.

Species
Hemithecium alboglauca
Hemithecium amboliense
Hemithecium andamanicum
Hemithecium argopholis
Hemithecium canlaonense
Hemithecium duomurisporum
Hemithecium endofusca
Hemithecium flavoalbum
Hemithecium flexile
Hemithecium himalayanum
Hemithecium implicatum
Hemithecium kodayarense
Hemithecium nagalandicum
Hemithecium nakanishianum
Hemithecium oshioi
Hemithecium pulchellum
Hemithecium radicicola
Hemithecium rimulosum
Hemithecium scariosum
Hemithecium staigerae
Hemithecium verrucosum

References

Graphidaceae
Lichen genera
Ostropales genera
Taxa named by Vittore Benedetto Antonio Trevisan de Saint-Léon
Taxa described in 1853